Eliot Ness (April 19, 1903 – May 16, 1957) was an American Prohibition agent known for his efforts to bring down Al Capone and enforce Prohibition in Chicago. He was the leader of a team of law enforcement agents, nicknamed The Untouchables. His co-authorship of an autobiography, The Untouchables, which was released shortly after his death, launched several television and motion picture portrayals establishing Ness's posthumous fame as an incorruptible crime fighter.

Early life 
Eliot Ness was born on April 19, 1903, in the Kensington neighborhood of Chicago, Illinois. He was the youngest of five children born to Peter Ness (1850–1931) and Emma King (1863–1937). His parents, both Norwegian immigrants, operated a bakery. Ness attended Christian Fenger High School in Chicago. He was educated at the University of Chicago, graduating in 1925 with a degree in political science and business administration, and was a member of Sigma Alpha Epsilon. He began his career as an investigator for the Retail Credit Company of Atlanta assigned to the Chicago territory, where he conducted background investigations for the purpose of credit information. In 1929, he returned to the university to take a graduate course in criminology taught by August Vollmer, a noted police reformer and chief of the Berkeley Police Department. Vollmer's ideas about professionalizing law enforcement would influence Ness throughout his career.

Career

1926–1931 

Ness's brother-in-law, Alexander Jamie, an agent of the Bureau of Investigation (which became the Federal Bureau of Investigation in 1935), influenced Ness to enter law enforcement. Ness joined the U.S. Treasury Department in 1926, working with the 1,000-strong Bureau of Prohibition in Chicago.

In March 1930, attorney Frank J. Loesch of the Chicago Crime Commission asked President Herbert Hoover to take down Al Capone. Agents of the Bureau of Internal Revenue, working under Elmer Irey and Special Agent Frank J. Wilson of the Intelligence Unit, were already investigating Capone and his associates for income tax evasion. In late 1930, Attorney General William D. Mitchell, seeking a faster end to the case, implemented a plan devised by President Hoover for sending a small team of Prohibition agents, working under a special United States attorney, to target the illegal breweries and supply routes of Capone while gathering evidence of conspiracy to violate the National Prohibition Act (informally known as the Volstead Act). U.S. attorney George E.Q. Johnson, the Chicago prosecutor directly in charge of both the Prohibition and income tax investigations of Capone, chose the 27-year-old Ness (now assigned to the Justice Department) to lead this small squad.

With corruption of Chicago's law enforcement agents endemic, Ness went through the records of all Prohibition agents to create a reliable team (initially of six, eventually growing to about ten) later known as "The Untouchables." Raids against illegal stills and breweries began in March 1931. Within six months, Ness's agents had destroyed bootlegging operations worth an estimated $500,000 and representing an additional $2 million in lost income for Capone; their raids would ultimately cost Capone in excess of $9 million in lost revenue. The main source of information for the raids was an extensive wiretapping operation.

In 1931, a member of Al Capone's gang promised Ness that he would receive $2,000 every week ($36,684.27 in 2022) if he ignored their bootlegging activities. Ness refused the bribe. Failed attempts by members of the Chicago Outfit to bribe or intimidate Ness and his agents inspired Charles Schwarz of the Chicago Daily News to begin calling them "untouchables". George Johnson adopted the nickname and promoted it to the press, establishing it as the squad's unofficial title.

The efforts of Ness and his team inflicted major financial damage on Capone's operations and led to his indictment on 5,000 violations of the Volstead Act in June 1931. Federal judge James H. Wilkerson prevented that indictment from coming to trial, instead pursuing the tax evasion case built by George Johnson and Frank Wilson. On October 17, 1931, Capone was convicted on three of 22 counts of tax evasion. He was sentenced to eleven years in prison and, following a failed appeal, began his sentence in 1932. On May 3, 1932, Ness was among the federal agents who took Capone from the Cook County Jail to Dearborn Station, where he boarded the Dixie Flyer to the Atlanta Federal Penitentiary—the only time the two men are known to have met in person.

1932–1957 
In 1932, Ness was promoted to Chief Investigator of the Prohibition Bureau for Chicago. Following the end of Prohibition in 1933, he was assigned as an alcohol tax agent in the "Moonshine Mountains" of southern Ohio, Kentucky, and Tennessee, and in 1934 he was transferred to Cleveland, Ohio. In December 1935, Cleveland mayor Harold H. Burton hired Ness as the city's Safety Director, which put him in charge of both the police and fire departments. Ness soon began a reform program inspired by the ideas of August Vollmer, which focused on professionalizing and modernizing the police, stopping juvenile delinquency, and improving traffic safety. He declared war on the mob, and his primary targets included "Big" Angelo Lonardo, "Little" Angelo Scirrca, Moe Dalitz, John Angerola, George Angersola, and Charles Pollizi.

Ness was also Safety Director at the time of the murders known as the Cleveland Torso Murders, occurring in the Cleveland area from 1935 to 1938; though he had oversight of the police department, he was only peripherally involved in the investigation. Ness interrogated one of the prime suspects of the murders, Dr. Francis E. Sweeney, using a polygraph test. At one point in time, two bodies of the victims of the serial killer were placed within view of his office window.

In 1938, Ness and his wife Edna divorced. His otherwise successful career in Cleveland withered gradually. He especially fell out of favor after he had the city's large shantytowns evacuated and burned during the Cleveland Torso Murders. Cleveland critics targeted his divorce, his high-profile social drinking, and his conduct in a car accident one night when he was driving drunk. Although there were no victims in the accident, Ness, fearful that he might lose his job, tried to get the accident covered up. Later, his involvement in the accident was revealed by a local newspaper and calls for his resignation increased; however, Burton's successor as mayor, Frank Lausche, kept Ness on.

In 1939, Ness married illustrator Evaline Michelow. In 1942, the Nesses moved to Washington, D.C., where he worked for the federal government. He directed the battle against prostitution in communities surrounding military bases, where venereal disease was a serious medical issue. Later he made a number of forays into the corporate world, all of which failed owing to his lack of business acumen. In 1944, he left to become chairman of the Diebold Corporation, a security company based in Ohio.

After his second divorce and third marriage, he ran unsuccessfully for Mayor of Cleveland in 1947, after which he left Diebold in 1951. In the aftermath, Ness was forced into taking odd jobs to earn a living, including bookstore clerk and wholesaler of electronics parts and frozen hamburger patties. By 1956, he came to work for a startup company called Guaranty Paper Corporation, which claimed to have a new method of watermarking legal and official documents to prevent counterfeiting. Ness was offered the job because of his expertise in law enforcement and moved from Cleveland to Coudersport, Pennsylvania, where much of the investment capital for the company was located. Now drinking more heavily, Ness spent his free time in a local bar, telling stories of his law enforcement career. Guaranty Paper began to fall apart when it became clear that one of Ness's business partners had misrepresented the nature of their supposedly proprietary watermarking process, leaving Ness in serious financial jeopardy.

In later years, Ness struggled financially; he was nearly penniless at the time of his death, with his role in bringing down Al Capone having been largely forgotten.

Personal life 
Ness was married to Edna Stahle (1900–1988) from 1929 to 1938, illustrator Evaline Michelow (1911–1986) from 1939 to 1945, and artist Elisabeth Andersen Seaver (1906–1977) from 1946 until his death in 1957. He also had an adopted son, Robert (1946–1976).

Death 

Shortly after his approval of the final galleys for The Untouchables, on whose writing he and Oscar Fraley had been collaborating as a means, on Ness' part, of earning money in his later years, Ness collapsed and died of a heart attack at his home in Coudersport, Pennsylvania, on May 16, 1957. He was 54 years of age. His body was cremated, and his ashes were scattered in one of the small ponds on the grounds of Lake View Cemetery in Cleveland. An admirer later donated a plot near the pond and erected a cenotaph in his honor there.

Ness was survived by his widow, Elisabeth Andersen Seaver, and adopted son, Robert.

Legacy

Archive 
The Western Reserve Historical Society houses additional Ness papers, including a scrapbook (1928–1936), copies of newspaper clippings (1935–1950), a typewritten manuscript detailing Ness's career in Chicago, and miscellaneous papers, including a report on the Fidelity Check Corporation and Guaranty Paper, of which Ness was president.

Art, entertainment, and media 
Numerous media works have been developed based on Eliot Ness's life and the legend surrounding his work in Chicago. The first of these resulted in Ness's last years in collaboration with Oscar Fraley in writing the book The Untouchables (1957), which was published after Ness's death and went on to sell 1.5 million copies. Although the historical veracity of this book has been questioned, later research suggests that it is broadly accurate. A 21-page manuscript that Ness wrote for the book is housed in the archives of the Western Reserve Historical Society in Cleveland, Ohio.

The book was adapted in multiple media and inspired many additional works. The best-known adaptations include the 1959 TV series The Untouchables, which starred Robert Stack as Ness and was narrated by Walter Winchell, and the 1987 film The Untouchables, directed by Brian De Palma, which starred Kevin Costner as Ness and featured Sean Connery and Robert De Niro as Al Capone. These two fictionalized portrayals, more than actual history, have inspired numerous novels; a TV-movie, The Return of Eliot Ness, in which Stack returned to the role; a second, short-lived 1993 TV series titled The Untouchables, which starred Tom Amandes as Ness and William Forsythe as Capone; stage plays such as Peter Ullian's In the Shadow of the Terminal Tower; and comic books such as Torso. Ness was portrayed by actor Jim True-Frost in the fifth-season episode "The Good Listener" of the HBO television series Boardwalk Empire.

Max Allan Collins used Ness as the "police contact/best friend" character in his series of historical private eye novels featuring Chicago detective Nate Heller. Later he spun Ness off into his own series, set during his tenure as Cleveland's Public Safety Director. The first book, The Dark City (1987), depicted Ness's getting hired and undertaking a cleanup of the graft-ridden police force; the second, Butcher's Dozen (1988), his pursuit of the serial killer known as the Mad Butcher of Kingsbury Run. Bullet Proof (1989) pitted Ness against labor racketeers intent on taking over Cleveland's food service industry. Ness is mentioned in many hip hop and rap tracks ("California Love", for example). Murder by the Numbers (1993) depicted Ness's investigation of the numbers racket in Cleveland. All of these novels, while fictionalized, were closely based on actual cases investigated by Ness and the Cleveland Police. Collins also wrote a one-man stage play, Eliot Ness – An Untouchable Life, which was nominated for an Edgar Award. Collins wrote Ness into his graphic novel Road to Perdition.

In 2018, Collins collaborated with historian A. Brad Schwartz on a nonfiction dual biography of Ness and Capone entitled Scarface and the Untouchable: Al Capone, Eliot Ness, and the Battle for Chicago. Collins and Schwartz are currently writing a second volume about Ness's years in Cleveland, entitled The Untouchable and the Butcher.

Beer 
Cleveland-based Great Lakes Brewing Company, which claims several connections to Ness (including the brewery owners' mother having worked as his stenographer), named an amber lager "Eliot Ness" and included several subtle nods to his career in the beer description and label art.

Proposed building naming 

On January 10, 2014, Illinois U.S. Senators Dick Durbin and Mark Kirk and Ohio Senator Sherrod Brown proposed naming the headquarters of the Bureau of Alcohol, Tobacco, Firearms and Explosives in Washington, D.C., after Ness. If approved, it would have been called the Eliot Ness ATF Building. Brown said in a statement: "Eliot Ness is perhaps best known as the man who helped to bring Al Capone to justice. But Eliot Ness was more than just a Chicago U.S. prohibition agent. He fought for law and justice in Ohio, and fought for peace and freedom in World War II. He was a public servant and an American hero who deserves to be remembered."

Chicago Aldermen Edward M. Burke (14th Ward) and James Balcer (11th Ward) introduced a resolution in the Chicago City Council to oppose the renaming. In a news release, Burke said: "Eliot Ness had a checkered career after leaving the federal government. I simply do not think his image matches the actual reality of his legacy."

The authors of two separate Ness biographies later disputed the accuracy of Burke's claims, suggesting he mischaracterized Ness's career. "If Hollywood has given Eliot Ness too much credit for getting Capone," Max Allan Collins wrote in an article for HuffPost, "he has received too little credit anywhere else for helping professionalize law enforcement in the mid-20th Century."

Although the Senate resolution was never adopted, the main atrium in the ATF headquarters building was later renamed for Eliot Ness and features a historical exhibit about the Untouchables.

Festival and museum 
Coudersport, Pennsylvania, the town where Ness spent his final months and died, has held an annual "Eliot Ness Festival" every third weekend in July since 2018. Past events have included a public reunion of people descended from the original Untouchables, a dramatization of Al Capone's trial, film screenings, author talks, and antique car shows.

In 2019, an "Eliot Ness Museum" inspired by the annual festival opened in downtown Coudersport, featuring several antique cars and exhibits describing Ness's life and career.

References

Further reading 
 
 
 
 
 
 
 "Ness, Eliot" Encyclopedia Of Cleveland History

External links 

 The FBI, Eliot Ness  & The Untouchables (historicalgmen.squarespace.com)
  Biography of Eliot Ness  (Free Information Society)
 Biography of Eliot Ness (Pennsylvania Center for the Book)
  Eliot Ness FBI file

1903 births
1957 deaths
Al Capone
American law enforcement officials
American people of Norwegian descent
Anti-crime activists
Burials at Lake View Cemetery, Cleveland
Cleveland Division of Police
Diebold
Illinois Republicans
Ohio Republicans
People from Chicago
People from Cleveland
The Untouchables
University of Chicago alumni